is a Japanese mathematician
known for his original work in the field of Lie theory, and in 
particular for the
theory of discontinuous groups
(lattice in Lie groups)
and the application of geometric analysis to representation theory. He was a major developer in
particular of the theory of discontinuous groups for 
non-Riemannian homogeneous spaces and
the theory of discrete breaking symmetry in unitary representation theory.

He has been a member of the Science Council of Japan since 2006,
Board of Trustees of the Mathematical Society of Japan (2003–2007),
the Editor in Chief of the Journal of the Mathematical Society of Japan
(2002–2006), and currently is the Managing Editor of the Japanese Journal of 
Mathematics since 2006.

Academic career
Ph.D./Doctor of Science, 1990, University of Tokyo
Assistant Professor, 1987–1991, Associate Professor, 1991–2001, University of Tokyo
Associate Professor, 2001–2003, RIMS, Kyoto University
Full Professor, 2003–2007, RIMS, Kyoto University
Full Professor, 2007-, University of Tokyo
Principal Investigator, 2011-, Kavli Institute for the Physics and Mathematics of the Universe  (IPMU)

He has held many invited positions including Institute for Advanced Study in Princeton, USA (1991–1992),
Mittag-Leffler Institute, Sweden (1995–1996), Université de Paris, Université de Paris VI, France (1999), Harvard University, USA (2000–2001, 2008), Université de Paris VII, France 
(2003), and Max-Planck-Institut für Mathematik in Bonn, Germany (2007).

Awards and honors

 1997 - Takebe Prize, The Mathematical Society of Japan
 1999 - Spring Prize, The Mathematical Society of Japan
 2006 - Osaka Science Prize
 2006/2007 - Sackler Distinguished Lecturer
 2007 - JSPS Prize, The Japan Society for the Promotion of Science
 2008 - The Humboldt Prize
 2011 - Inoue Prize For Science
 2014 - Medal with Purple Ribbon, Japan
 2015 - JMSJ Outstanding Paper Prize
 2017 class of Fellows of the American Mathematical Society "for contributions to the structure and representation theory of reductive Lie groups".

Selected publications
Journal articles
 
 
 

Books

Kobayashi, T. Discontinuous groups for non-Riemannian homogeneous spaces. In: B. Engquist and W. Schmid, editors, Mathematics Unlimited - 2001 and Beyond, pages 723-747. Springer-Verlag, 2001. .

References

External links
 
 Publications
 

1962 births
Living people
Differential geometers
20th-century Japanese mathematicians
21st-century Japanese mathematicians
University of Tokyo
University of Tokyo alumni
Academic staff of the University of Paris
Harvard University staff
People from Osaka
Recipients of the Medal with Purple Ribbon
Fellows of the American Mathematical Society